Vasiliy Lomachenko vs. Teófimo López, billed as Winner Takes All, was a unification professional boxing match contested between WBA (Super), WBO, and The Ring lightweight champion, Vasiliy Lomachenko, and IBF lightweight champion, Teófimo López. The bout took place on October 17, 2020, at the MGM Grand Conference Center in Paradise, Nevada. López defeated Lomachenko via unanimous decision (UD) with the judges' scorecards reading 119–109, 117–111, and 116–112.

Background
López' scored a second-round technical knockout victory against Richard Commey to capture the IBF lightweight title on December 14, 2019. In the same month, Lomachenko announced there was an agreement to face the newly crowned champion in a unification bout in April, saying, "On paper, there is an agreement that the match is going to happen, and it's going to happen in April. However, they have not yet established a date. This fight is happening in April." On February 8, López hinted at a date and location for the fight on Twitter, with lyrics from the song "New York, New York", posting, "May 30th. Start spreadin' the news, I'm leaving today, I want to be a part of it. PP_?". The proposed date was eventually scrapped due to the COVID-19 pandemic, with Lomachenko going back to his native home of Ukraine. Bob Arum, promoter of both fighters, offered each an interim bout to take place in July, which both rejected. Arum stated the new date being looked at would be September. After October was chosen as a new date, the fight appeared to be in jeopardy due to a pay dispute from López, who was unhappy with an offer of $1.25m while Lomachenko was set to earn in excess of $3.5m. With López' manager, David McWater explaining, "We think that [Lomachenko] probably deserves more money, but not three times as much. We’re hoping that there is enough impetus to get this fight done, and Top Rank will come back and talk to us". On September 8, after weeks of difficult negotiations, the bout was finally announced for October 17, with the venue set for the MGM Grand Conference Center in Paradise, Nevada.

Fight details 

López defeated Lomachenko via unanimous decision with scores of 116–112, 119–109 and 117–111. Judge Julie Lederman's scorecard of 119–109, giving Lomachenko only a single round, received significant controversy. The fight started off with López finding his jab and going to the body to slow down his opponent. Lomachenko threw fewer punches in the first seven rounds, allowing López to control most of the first half of the fight. In the second half, Lomachenko started coming out more offensively, landing more punches. In the final round, López landed 50 of 98 punches thrown (51%), the highest ever in a round for an opponent Lomachenko has faced. CompuBox stats showed López was the busier of the two, landing 183 of 659 thrown (28%), while Lomachenko was more accurate landing 141 of 321 thrown (44%). López outlanded Lomachenko in 8 of the 12 rounds.

Fight card

Broadcaster 
The fight was televised live on ESPN and streamed live on ESPN+ for the U.S. (in both English and Spanish languages) viewers only.

Viewership
The fight drew about  viewers in the United States. When it aired live on television, it drew an average of 2,729,000 viewers and a peak of 2,898,000 viewers. On the ESPN app and ESPN+, the fight drew nearly  viewers.

References

2020 in boxing
2020 in sports in Nevada
MGM Grand Las Vegas
October 2020 sports events in the United States
Boxing matches